Best 15 Things (stylized as Best 15 things) is the second compilation album by American singer Amerie. It was released only in selected Asian countries on March 18, 2009 by Columbia. It contained material from her first three studio albums: All I Have (2002), Touch (2005) and Because I Love It (2007).

Track listing

Sample credits
"Why Don't We Fall in Love" contains a sample of "Condor! (Theme)/I Got You Where I Want You", as performed by Dave Grusin from the soundtrack to the 1975 film Three Days of the Condor and excerpts from The Ebons' "You're the Reason Why", written by Kenneth Gamble and Leon Huff.
"1 Thing" contains excerpts from The Meters' "Oh! Calcutta!", written by Stanley Walden.
"Rolling Down My Face" contains an interpolation of Roy Ayers' "Searching", written by Ayers.
"I'm Coming Out" is a cover of the track of the same title by Diana Ross.
"Some Like It" contains a sample of "World's Famous" by Malcolm McLaren.
"Take Control" contains a sample of "Jimi Renda-Se" by Tom Zé and "You Make My Dreams" by Hall & Oates.
"Gotta Work" contains a sample of "Hold on I'm Coming" by Mighty Dog Haynes.

Release history

References

Amerie albums
2009 compilation albums
Columbia Records compilation albums